Agarista populifolia is a plant species in the family Ericaceae with the common name of Florida hobblebush.  It forms dense thickets which are difficult to penetrate, thus the common name.  Stems often lean and arching. It is found in the southeastern United States inhabiting moist to wet woodlands.  It is an evergreen shrub with small white flowers on the underside of its arching branches.

References

External links
USDA Plant Profile

Vaccinioideae
Flora of the Southeastern United States
Flora of Florida
Taxa named by Jean-Baptiste Lamarck